Edward Senzo Mchunu (born 21 April 1958) is a South African politician currently serving as Minister of Water and Sanitation since 5 August 2021. A member of the African National Congress (ANC), he was formerly the Minister of Public Service and Administration from 30 May 2019 to 5 August 2021 and the Premier of KwaZulu-Natal from 22 August 2013 until 23 May 2016. 

A teacher by training, Mchunu was the inaugural Provincial Secretary of the ANC's branch in KwaZulu-Natal after its establishment in 1994, and he was first elected to the KwaZulu-Natal Provincial Legislature in 1997. While still in the legislature, he returned to the ANC Provincial Secretary position from 2005 until May 2009, when he was appointed Member of the Executive Council for Education in Zweli Mkhize's provincial government. In 2013, he succeeded Mkhize both as ANC Provincial Chairperson and as Premier of KwaZulu-Natal. He was ousted from the party office in November 2015 in a bitter contest with Sihle Zikalala, and in May 2016 the ANC compelled him to resign from the Premier's office.

Formerly an ally of President Jacob Zuma, Mchunu was politically aligned to Cyril Ramaphosa by 2016. In 2017 he won election to the ANC National Executive Committee and he subsequently served a brief stint as head of organising at Luthuli House, the ANC's national headquarters, until he was appointed to Ramaphosa's cabinet after the 2019 general election. He was re-elected to a second five-year term on the ANC National Executive Committee in December 2022.

Early life and education 
Mchunu was born in April 1958 at eNhlwathi in KwaHlabisa in the northern part of present-day KwaZulu-Natal. He attended high school in Pietermaritzburg and later enrolled at the University of Zululand; he completed his degree, a Bachelor of Arts in education and international relations, at the University of South Africa in 1986. After graduating he worked as a teacher at high schools in Nquthu and Eshowe.

In 1991, after the African National Congress (ANC) was unbanned by the apartheid government, Mchunu became the inaugural Regional Secretary of the ANC's branch in Northern Natal. His appointment to this position marked his entrance to professional politics. In 1994, he was elected as the inaugural Provincial Secretary of the ANC's KwaZulu-Natal branch, under Provincial Chairperson Jacob Zuma.

Provincial political career

KwaZulu-Natal Legislature: 1997–2009 
In 1997, Mchunu was sworn in as a Member of the KwaZulu-Natal Provincial Legislature. Over the next decade, he chaired various committees in the legislature. 

He also returned to the ANC's provincial leadership corps from 1998, when he was elected ANC Deputy Provincial Secretary, serving under Provincial Chairperson S'bu Ndebele and Provincial Secretary Sipho Gcabashe. He was re-elected in September 2002 despite a challenge to his incumbency by Mbuso Kubheka: he received 304 votes against Kubheka's 171.

At the party's next provincial elective conference in May 2005, Mchunu was elected to succeed Gcabashe as Provincial Secretary, apparently with the support of Jacob Zuma, who by then was Deputy President of South Africa. While Provincial Secretary, Mchunu – like the incumbent ANC Provincial Chairperson, Zweli Mkhize – was reportedly a strong supporter of Zuma during Zuma's heated rivalry with ANC President Thabo Mbeki. Mchunu was re-elected as Provincial Secretary in June 2008; at that time he remained a Member of the Provincial Legislature.

KwaZulu-Natal Executive Council: 2009–2013 
In the 2009 general election, Mchunu was re-elected to his legislative seat and Zweli Mkhize was elected Premier of KwaZulu-Natal. On 11 May 2009, Mkhize announced that he had appointed Mchunu to the KwaZulu-Natal provincial government as Member of the Executive Council (MEC) for Education. Because Mchunu's role as ANC Provincial Secretary was full-time, it was incompatible with his government appointment; he vacated the party office and was replaced by his deputy, Sihle Zikalala, in July. He remained MEC for Education until his own ascension to the premiership in 2013.

Towards the end of his term as MEC, in March 2013, Mchunu was elected Provincial Chairperson of the KwaZulu-Natal ANC, succeeding Mkhize, who had been elected to the full-time position of national ANC Treasurer-General. Mchunu received 385 votes against the 373 votes received by the other candidate, incumbent Deputy Provincial Chairperson Willies Mchunu. According to the Mail & Guardian, his candidacy was opposed by Zuma (who by then was President of South Africa), apparently because Mchunu had not supported Zuma's bid for re-election at the ANC's 53rd National Conference in December 2012.

KwaZulu-Natal Premier: 2013–2016 
In order to take up the Treasurer-General position, Mkhize also resigned from his government position as KwaZulu-Natal Premier; Mchunu was sworn in as acting Premier on 22 August 2013 and on 26 September 2013 was formally elected to succeed Mkhize. In the 2014 general election, Mchunu was elected to a full term as Premier.

At the ANC's next provincial elective conference in November 2015, Mchunu ran for re-election as ANC Provincial Chairperson but was defeated by his one-time deputy, Sihle Zikalala, who received 780 votes against Mchunu's 675. Mchunu also failed to gain election as an ordinary member of the ANC Provincial Executive Committee. The outcome led to an outbreak of bitter factionalism in the provincial party, reportedly leading to several political assassinations. Mchunu's supporters claimed that the vote had been rigged and successfully challenged it in the courts, leading in late 2017 to the nullification of the election and the dissolution of Zikalala's leadership corps.

However, by then, Mchunu had been removed from the KwaZulu-Natal premiership: he resigned on 23 May 2016 under significant pressure from leaders of both the provincial and the national ANC. He said that he had informed the national ANC leadership that he had "reservations" about the circumstances of his departure. Shortly afterwards, the ANC announced that he would be replaced as Premier by Willies Mchunu and that he would be offered an ANC seat in the national Parliament.

National political career

Luthuli House: 2017–2019 
Ahead of the ANC's 54th National Conference, Mchunu stood to succeed Gwede Mantashe as ANC Secretary-General. He ran on an informal slate aligned to Cyril Ramaphosa – he was reportedly a longstanding supporter of Ramaphosa's bid to be elected ANC President. Indeed, the Daily Maverick said that Mchunu became Ramaphosa's "chief campaigner in KwaZulu-Natal". At the conference, held at Nasrec in December 2017, Ramaphosa won the presidency but Mchunu lost the Secretary-General position in a vote to Ace Magashule, who received 2,360 votes to Mchunu's 2,336. Because of the narrow 24-vote margin that decided the contest, the outcome was subject to controversy and a recount. 

Despite his defeat in the Secretary-General race, the 54th National Conference elected Mchunu to a five-year term as an ordinary member of the ANC National Executive Committee. He received 1,800 votes across the 4,283 ballots cast, making him the 18th-most popular of the 80 candidates elected. In February 2018, he was appointed chairperson of organising and campaigns in the party, a full-time position that was based out of the ANC's national headquarters at Luthuli House in Johannesburg and that involved working closely with the Secretary-General's office. Ramaphosa and his supporters had reportedly pushed for Mchunu to be appointed to the role, while Ace Magashule's preferred candidate was Dakota Legoete, who was appointed Mchunu's deputy.

National cabinet: 2019–2022 
In the 2019 general election, Mchunu was elected as a Member of the National Assembly, ranked 13th on the ANC's party list. Ramaphosa was elected to his first full term as President in the same election, and he appointed Mchunu to his cabinet as Minister of Public Service and Administration. Sindy Chikunga was appointed as Mchunu's deputy. 

On 5 August 2021, Ramaphosa announced a cabinet reshuffle in which Mchunu was moved to the Ministry of Water and Sanitation, newly split from the former Ministry of Human Settlements, Water and Sanitation. Dikeledi Magadzi was appointed Deputy Minister for Water and Sanitation in the same reshuffle.

At the ANC's 55th National Conference in December 2022, Mchunu was re-elected to a second five-year term on the party's National Executive Committee; he was ranked sixth of the 80 candidates elected, receiving 1,932 votes across 4,029 ballots. In the run-up to the conference, he was also considered a likely running mate for Ramaphosa, who was running for re-election to the ANC presidency; however, he ultimately was not nominated to stand for a top party office.

Personal life 
Mchunu married Thembeka (born 31 January 1968) in July 1990. She is also a politician. They have four children – Zinhle, Mathuthu, Jama, and Phakade – and grandchildren.

References

External links 

 

|-

1958 births
Living people
African National Congress politicians
Premiers of KwaZulu-Natal
Members of the National Assembly of South Africa
People from KwaZulu-Natal
University of South Africa alumni